Philemon (c. 362 BC – c. 262 BC) was an Athenian poet and playwright of the New Comedy. He was born either at Soli in Cilicia or at Syracuse in Sicily but moved to Athens some time before 330 BC, when he is known to have been producing plays.

He attained remarkable popularity, for he repeatedly won victories over his younger contemporary and rival Menander, whose delicate wit was apparently less to the taste of the Athenians of the time than Philemon's comedy.

Except for a short sojourn in Egypt with Ptolemy II Philadelphus, he passed his life at Athens. He there died, nearly a hundred years old, but with mental vigour unimpaired, about the year 262 BC, according to the story, at the moment of his being crowned on the stage.

Surviving titles and fragments
Of his ninety-seven works, fifty-seven are known to us by titles and fragments. Two of his plays were the basis for two Latin adaptations of Plautus (Mercator being adapted from Emporos, and Trinummus from Thesauros).

Adelphoi ("Brothers")
Agroikos ("The Country-Dweller")
Agyrtes  ("The Beggar-Priest")
Aitolos ("Aetolus")
Anakalypton  ("The Man Who Reveals, or Unveils")
Ananeoumene ("The Renewed Woman")
Androphonos ("The Man-Slayer")
Apokarteron ("The Starving Man")
Apolis  ("One Exiled From the City")
Arpazomenos ("The Captured, or Seized, Man")
Auletes ("The Flute-Player")
Babylonios ("The Babylonian Man")
Chera ("The Widow")
Ekoikizomenos
Emporos ("The Merchant")
Encheiridion  ("Handbook")
Epidikazomenos ("The Claimant")
Euripos ("Euripus")
Ephebos ("The Adolescent")
Ephedritai
Gamos ("Marriage")
Heroes ("The Heroes")
Hypobolimaios ("The Changeling")
Iatros ("The Physician")
Katapseudomenos ("The False Accuser")
Koinonoi ("Companions")
Kolax ("The Flatterer")
Korinthia ("The Woman From Corinth")
Lithoglyphos ("The Stone-Carver," or "Engraver")
Metion, or Zomion
Moichos  ("The Adulterer")
Myrmidones  ("The Myrmidons")
Mystis ("Woman Initiated Into The Mysteries")
Neaira ("Neaira")
Nemomenoi ("Those Who Share")
Nothos ("The Bastard")
Nyx ("Night")
Paides ("Children")
Palamedes ("Palamedes")
Panegyris ("The Assembly")
Pankratiastes
Pareision ("The Gate-Crasher")
Phasma ("The Phantom, or Spectre")
Philosophoi ("Philosophers")
Pittokopumenos ("Pitch-Plastered")
Pterygion
Ptoche ("The Poor Woman"), or Rhodia ("The Woman From Rhodes")
Pyrphoros ("The Fire-Bearer")
Pyrrhos ("Pyrrhus")
Sardios ("The Man From Sardis", or possibly "Carnelian")
Sikelikos ("The Sicilian Man," possibly belongs to Diphilus)
Stratiotes ("The Soldier")
Synapothneskontes ("Men Dying Together")
Synephebos ("Fellow Adolescent")
Thebaioi ("Men From Thebes")
Thesauros ("The Treasure")
Thyroros ("The Door-Keeper")

References 

 William Smith, Dictionary of Greek and Roman Biography and Mythology, v. 3 (1870), p. 261.
 Text adapted from 

Ancient Greek dramatists and playwrights
Ancient Greek poets
New Comic poets
4th-century BC Greek people
3rd-century BC Greek people
4th-century BC writers
3rd-century BC writers
360s BC births
260s BC deaths